Something to Shout About may refer to:
Something to Shout About (album), a 1965 LP from British singer Lulu
Something to Shout About (film), a 1943 Columbia musical film directed by Gregory Ratoff